Élodie Jacquier-Laforge (born 15 April 1978) is a French politician representing the Democratic Movement. She was elected to the French National Assembly on 18 June 2017, representing the department of Isère.

From 2004 until 2016, Jacquier-Laforge served as the parliamentary assistant to Jacqueline Gourault.

In parliament, Jacquier-Laforge serves as member of the Committee on Legal Affairs.

References

1978 births
Living people
Politicians from Grenoble
Democratic Movement (France) politicians
Deputies of the 15th National Assembly of the French Fifth Republic
Deputies of the 16th National Assembly of the French Fifth Republic
Women members of the National Assembly (France)
21st-century French women politicians
Paris 2 Panthéon-Assas University alumni